Bethany College is an independent  Roman Catholic comprehensive single-sex secondary day school for girls, located in Hurstville, a southern suburb in Sydney, New South Wales, Australia. In 2009 Bethany Junior and Senior campuses amalgamated into one campus in Hurstville.

Facilities
 Marian Building- classrooms, together with Food Technology Kitchens, Information Technology, Textiles, Music Rooms, and Homerooms.
 Yallunga Hall- multi-purposed hall (performances, assembly, indoor basketball court, rain shelter)
 MacKillop Building- Classrooms, Homerooms, Science Labs, 4 levels
 Sophia Building- Classrooms, homerooms.
 Penola Building- classrooms, homerooms 
 Caritas Block- Office, Chapel Staff Rooms and Staff Common Rooms, Reception room, Principals office
 Chisholm Building & Demountables- Classrooms, homerooms
 Year 7  Playground- Penola Court
 Year 8 Playground- Chisholm  Court
 Year 9 Playground- Chisholm Court
 Year 10 Playground- Yallunga Court 
 Year 11 Playground- Yallunga Court
 Year 12 Playground- Yallunga Court
 Basketball Courts- Penola and Yallunga Court

See also 

 List of Catholic schools in New South Wales
 Catholic education in Australia

References

External links

 Bethany College website

Catholic secondary schools in Sydney
Girls' schools in New South Wales
Educational institutions established in 1993
1993 establishments in Australia
Hurstville, New South Wales